Stress intensity can refer to:

 Stress intensity factor in fracture mechanics
 Tresca effective stress (after Henri Tresca) in material yielding